George Thomas Dave is an American businessman who is the founder and CEO of the kombucha company GT’s Living Foods. In the late 1990s, he was the first to put kombucha on store shelves and his company currently owns 40% of the U.S. kombucha market.

Early life and education
GT Dave was born in 1977 to Laraine and Michael Dave as the youngest of three sons.

In 1992, a family friend gifted them a SCOBY which had been given to her by a Buddhist nun. Dave's parents began homebrewing kombucha when Dave was a freshman at Beverly Hills High School. Dave's parents and older brother Adam immediately took to the new drink, however Dave thought it was weird, later recalling that "I thought, 'everyone thinks we're The Addams Family.'"

In 1994, Laraine was diagnosed with breast cancer and underwent a lumpectomy and a year of chemotherapy and radiation. During her battle with breast cancer she drank the homebrewed kombucha and after she beat the disease, she attributed it to the health benefits of their kombucha.

Dave, who was taking business classes at Santa Monica College after leaving high school early and receiving his GED, began homebrewing kombucha himself with the intention to bring it to market.

Career 
Dave was the first to put kombucha on store shelves. His first sale of kombucha (which he marketed as GT's Kombucha) was to Erewhon Natural Foods in 1995, when he sold two cases (24 bottles) which nearly sold out in the first day. From his bedroom, he would call buyers, distributors and store owners, using different voices to pose as different employees.

He continued to homebrew kombucha in his family home, which quickly outgrew the kitchen and expanded to the living room, and would sleep from 4 p.m. to midnight and work while his family slept. His mother Laraine helped him market the product by setting up tasting tables and sharing her cancer story.

GT's Kombucha continued to grow and in December 1997, when he was selling 30 to 50 cases per day, he rented a 2,000-square-foot industrial space in Gardena and began to hire employees. That was when Whole Foods Market called to inquire about distributing his kombucha. He initially hesitated, but ultimately decided to accept their offer, stressing the importance of preserving the integrity of his product.

GT's Kombucha was now in stores across the Southwest and he rented another 2,000 square feet space in Gardena. The demand continued to grow as Dave expanded to more regions and he struggled to keep up with demand but as he insisted on brewing the traditional way with close oversight over every batch.

GT's Kombucha later rebranded as GT's Living Foods and now produces over one million bottles per year in its 100,000-square-foot campus in Vernon. Dave has declined multiple acquisition offers and remains sole owner of GT's Living Foods which is worth over $900 million and owns 40% of the U.S. kombucha market.

Personal life 
Dave is openly gay and is married to Allan Fanucchi. On April 29th, 2021, Dave welcomed his first child, a son named Bloume.

He drinks eight to twelve bottles of his kombucha per day and taste tests each batch.

In 1996, Dave’s older brother Justin passed away due to bone cancer. After his death, Dave's parents divorced. He remains close with his mother Laraine, whose cancer recovery is featured in the marketing of GT's Living Foods. His eldest brother, Adam, graduated from Louisiana State University's medical school in 2008.

In 2019, Dave donated one million dollars to Kombucha Brewers International in an effort to solidify a “standard of identity to protect the integrity of the product.”

Sources 
 Fake Doctors, Real Friends. Episode 402

External links
 

1978 births
Beverly Hills High School alumni
Santa Monica College alumni
American LGBT businesspeople
21st-century American businesspeople
20th-century American businesspeople
American drink industry businesspeople
Living people
Gay men